Weißenborn is a village in the municipality Gleichen (district of Göttingen), east of the city of Göttingen, Germany and between Bischhausen and Glasenhausen, near the border of Thuringia.  The population is about 260 people. The Garte creek originates in the village.  In addition to High German, the Elbe Eastphalian dialect of West Low German is spoken in the town.  The mayor is Friedrich Ehbrecht.  There is one church, the Lutheran Nicolaikirche.

Social and cultural activities

Sports

In 1921, the SV Fürth Weißenborn was founded.  After a wartime interruption, it was re-juvenated, only to undergo some ups and downs, including a merger in 1968 to form SV Bischhausen/Weißenborn. Soccer, though the original sport of the club, has declined in interest.  Hiking and gymnastics are actively pursued these days.  The club has a club-house in Weißenborn.

Schützenverein

The village has an active Schützenverein (marksmen club), with a festival the first week-end in July every year.  The organization has its own building, which can be used for family festivals throughout the year.

Volunteer Fire Department
There are a volunteer fire department and a youth volunteer fire department in the village.  The volunteer fire department was founded in 1921, while the youth fire department was founded in 1975.

References

External links
 Community home-page http://www.weissenborn-im-gartetal.de/
 Forest surrounding the village: http://www.weissenborn-im-gartetal.de/Realgemeinde%20.htm

Villages in Lower Saxony